Alfons Engling (born 1909, date of death unknown) was a German painter and sculptor.

Life and work 
Engling was born in Berlin, Germany. He studied at the Folkwangschule, Essen. He was also a student of Ernst Barlach. After World War II he worked in 1945-1946 with Gerd Grove at his studio in Lübeck. In 1950 he moved with his wife Marlies to Sao Paulo, Brazil. Together they founded “Studio Marlies”, a studio and school for arts and crafts. He started with a series of sculptures of what he found in everyday Brazilian life. Other sculptures reflect on religious themes like “Francis”, “Christophorus” or the “singing angel”. In 1952 he first entered the Salâo Paulista de Arte Moderna, No 2.

In 1963 and 1964 he won prizes for his paintings in Sao Paulo and exhibited at the “Expoicâo de Arte Teuto-Braseliera” in 1974. He was professor at the EBA Sâo Jose dos Campos, Sao Paulo.

In 1979 he returned to Germany and lived in Cologne, where he had his last exhibition Alfons Engling, Kunst unterm Dach in 1995. During this time he worked with his master scholar Ralph Tepel, who published in 1997 the catalogue Alfons Engling, Skulpturen und Plastiken, Cologne 1997, that showed pieces from the sculptural work of Engling between 1950 and 1979.

In 1985 the Academia de Belas Artes Sant'ana started the 1º Salão de Artes Plásticas P. Alfons Engling.

Major exhibitions 
 1952 Salâo Paulista de Arte Moderna
 1962 Salâo Paulista de Arte Moderna
 1974 Expoicâo de Arte Teuto-Braseliera
 1995 last exhibition: “Kunst unterm Dach” Cologne

Art Prizes 
 1963 Bronze medal of painting, Sao Paulo
 1964 Silver medal of painting, Sao Paulo

References 

German contemporary artists
20th-century German painters
German male painters
20th-century German sculptors
20th-century German male artists
German male sculptors
1909 births
Year of death missing